Harry LaRosiliere (born May 6, 1962) was the 39th mayor of Plano, Texas, the first African-American to hold the office. He was elected in 2013 and served until 2021 after reaching his term limit.

LaRosiliere was born in Haiti and grew up in Harlem. In New York City, he attended Corpus Christi Catholic School and Cardinal Hayes High School and graduated from the City College of New York in 1985 with a Bachelor of Science in geology.

LaRosiliere moved to Texas in 1994 and became a financial advisor. He served two terms on the Plano City Council from 2005 to 2011, and was the planning and zoning commissioner. He was elected mayor in 2013, defeating Collin County Republican Party Chairman Fred Moses. He was reelected in 2017.

LaRosiliere is married to Tracy LaRosiliere, née Clark. They have two daughters.

Electoral history

References

External links
 Office of the Mayor

1954 births
Living people
Haitian emigrants to the United States
American politicians of Haitian descent
People from Harlem
Mayors of places in Texas
Mayors of Plano, Texas
21st-century American politicians
Texas Republicans
African-American mayors in Texas
Black conservatism in the United States